The Dagda is an important god of Irish mythology.

Dagda can also refer to:

 Dagda, Latvia, a city in eastern Latvia
 Dagda Municipality, Latvia
 Dagda parish, Latvia